Charles Hérold Jr. (born 23 July 1990) is a Haitian footballer who plays as a right winger for Cibao FC in the Liga Dominicana de Fútbol.

International career

International goals
Scores and results list Haiti's goal tally first.

Honours

Club
 Cibao
CFU Club Championship (1): 2017

Individual
Ballon d'Or Haïtien (1): 2011

References

External links
 
 

1990 births
Living people
Haitian footballers
Association football midfielders
Tempête FC players
Liga Dominicana de Fútbol players
Cibao FC players
Ligue Haïtienne players
Haiti international footballers
Haitian expatriate footballers
Expatriate footballers in the Dominican Republic
Haitian expatriate sportspeople in the Dominican Republic
People from Gonaïves
2019 CONCACAF Gold Cup players
2021 CONCACAF Gold Cup players